Thomas E. Dobbs is an American physician currently serving as dean of the John D. Bower School of Population Health at the University of Mississippi Medical Center.

Dobbs previously served as State Health Officer of Mississippi, where he became widely known as the namesake of the Dobbs v. Jackson Women's Health Organization landmark decision of the U.S. Supreme Court in which the court held, in June 2022, that the Constitution of the United States does not confer a right to abortion. Dobbs himself had no involvement in the case.

Career
Dobbs graduated with a Bachelor of Science in Applied physics from Emory University. Afterwards, he studied Medicine, Internal Medicine, Epidemiology and Infectious Diseases at the University of Alabama. He thereafter worked in various positions in the Mississippi State Department of Health, including as Regional Health Officer from 2008 to 2012, as State Epidemiologist from 2012 to 2016, and briefly as Deputy State Health Officer in 2018 before following State Health Officer Mary Currier, who retired after 9 years of service.

References 

Living people
American physicians
American civil servants
University of Mississippi people
Year of birth missing (living people)